Lac Sakami is a lake in the northwest of the province of Quebec in Canada. It is located east of James Bay, south of the Robert-Bourassa Reservoir and north of the Opinaca Reservoir.

The Cree called the lake Mesackamee.

See also
List of lakes of Quebec

References

External links
Fishing on Lac Sakami

Lakes of Nord-du-Québec